Queensbury Quaker Burying Ground, also known as the Queensbury Friends Cemetery and Old Quaker Cemetery, is a historic Quaker burying ground located near Queensbury in Warren County, New York.  It was established about 1765 and remained in service until 1837.

This cemetery was the first in Queensbury.

A commemorative marker was installed in 1911 by the Wing family to honor that family's role in the settlement of Queensbury.  The burial ground contains approximately 80 burials.

The site was the location of a Quaker Meeting House and school, as well as cemetery. Today the site is a fenced patch of grassy ground next to a shopping center, marked by two plaques. The cemetery has no gravestones, in keeping with Quaker tradition of the time. In 2002, during planning for the shopping center, an archaeological survey was conducted. The burials were discovered, and the land deeded to Queensbury in perpetuity.

The site was listed on the National Register of Historic Places in 2015.

References

External links
 List of burials – Warren County, New York
 

Cemeteries on the National Register of Historic Places in New York (state)
1760s establishments in the Province of New York
Buildings and structures in Warren County, New York
National Register of Historic Places in Warren County, New York